Mount Low is located on the border of Alberta and British Columbia. It was named in 1920 after the Canadian geologist and explorer A. P. Low

See also
 List of peaks on the British Columbia–Alberta border
 List of mountains in the Canadian Rockies

References

Three-thousanders of Alberta
Three-thousanders of British Columbia
Mountains of Banff National Park
Canadian Rockies